The Van Cortlandt House Museum, also known as the Frederick Van Cortlandt House or simply the Van Cortlandt House, is the oldest building in the borough of the Bronx in New York City. It is located in the southwestern portion of Van Cortlandt Park, accessed via Broadway (U.S. Route 9).

History
The house was built in 1748 in the Georgian style by Africans enslaved by Frederick Van Cortlandt (1699–1749) for his family. Van Cortlandt died before its completion and the property was inherited by his son, James Van Cortlandt (1727–1781). Following his death, it was inherited by his younger brother, Augustus Van Cortlandt, the City Clerk of New York. It is a -story, L-shaped house with a double hipped roof. It was built of dressed fieldstone and is one of the nation's finest examples of the high Georgian style in stone.

The Van Cortlandts, a mercantile family prominent in New York affairs, established a grain plantation and grist mill on the property. The house was used during the Revolutionary War by  the Comte de Rochambeau, Marquis de Lafayette, and George Washington.

Ownership
Upon its initial construction, the house passed through successive family ownership from 1748 to 1888 by:
1748–1749: Frederick Van Cortlandt
1749–1781: James Van Cortlandt
1781–1823: Augustus Van Cortlandt
1823–1839: Augustus White Van Cortlandt
1839–1839: Henry White Van Cortlandt
1839–1884: Augustus Bibby Van Cortlandt

Historic house museum
In 1889, the family sold the property to the City of New York as part of Van Cortlandt Park's creation. The house has been operated as a historic house museum since 1897, the first in the city and fourth in the country.

It was added to the National Register of Historic Places in 1967 and became a National Historic Landmark in 1976.

Gallery
Historic American Buildings Survey, 1937

Present day

References

External links

 
 
 Van Cortlandt Park, New York City Department of Parks & Recreation
 Death in the Bronx, The Stockbridge Indian Massacre, August 31, 1778

Biographical museums in New York City
Georgian architecture in New York (state)
Historic American Buildings Survey in New York City
Historic house museums in New York City
Houses completed in 1748
Houses in the Bronx
Houses on the National Register of Historic Places in the Bronx
Museums in the Bronx
National Historic Landmarks in New York City
National Society of the Colonial Dames of America
New York City Designated Landmarks in the Bronx
New York City interior landmarks
Riverdale, Bronx
U.S. Route 9
Van Cortlandt family